The 1999–2000 Purdue Boilermakers men's basketball team represented Purdue University as a member of the Big Ten Conference during the 1999–2000 NCAA Division I men's basketball season. The team was led by Gene Keady and played its home games at Mackey Arena.

Roster

Schedule and results

|-
!colspan=9 style=| Regular season

|-
!colspan=9 style=| Big Ten Tournament

|-
!colspan=9 style=| NCAA Tournament

NCAA basketball tournament
During the 2000 NCAA Division I men's basketball tournament, Purdue qualified for the Elite Eight, where they lost to the Wisconsin Badgers.
West
Purdue (#6 seed) 62, Dayton (#11 seed) 61
Purdue 66, Oklahoma (#3 seed) 62
Purdue 75, Gonzaga (#10 seed) 66
Wisconsin (#8 seed) 64, Purdue 60

Rankings

Team players drafted into the NBA

References

Purdue
Purdue
Purdue Boilermakers men's basketball seasons
Purd
Purd